Libor Michálek (born 1968) is a Czech economist, politician, and whistleblower. He led successful corruption cases against the Czech National Property Fund and the Environment Ministry as former employees of both. He was the first Pirate Party candidate to be elected to office in a national legislature. His senatorial term was 2012–2018.

Early life and career 

Libor Michálek was born in Náchod in 1968. He graduated from high school in Přerov in 1987, and from Palacký University of Olomouc in 1992. He later studied in Masaryk University's management program, and received his MPA from Nottingham Trent University's executive program in 2010. After college, he worked as a UNIX programmer, business school teacher, and portfolio manager at an investment company. Michálek was a broker at the National Property Fund from 1994 to 1996, when he was fired after exposing a tunneling embezzlement scheme. The resulting court case found that he was improperly dismissed. He was later involved in compensating victims of financial crime. Michálek served as a capital market supervisor at the Czech Ministry of Finance from 1997 to 1998, a director at the Czech Securities Commission from 1998 to 2006, a director at the Czech National Bank from 2006 to 2007, a senior consultant at the World Bank in 2007, and the chief financial market inspector at the Czech National Bank from 2008 to 2010.

In August 2010, he became the director of the Czech State Environmental Fund. On 13 December 2010, Michálek filed a criminal complaint of corruption against the Environment Ministry in its tender for reconstruction of a Prague water treatment plant. Based on a secretly audiotaped conversation, Michálek also alleged that Martin Knetig, an advisor to environmental minister Pavel Drobil, asked him to manipulate the tender to fund his party (the Civic Democrats) and Drobil's political career. Michálek recorded his subsequent conversation with Drobil, who allegedly offered his deputy position for the destruction of the tapes. Upon the story's publication, Drobil fired Michálek and Knetig, denied any wrongdoing, and resigned a day later.

Prime Minister Petr Nečas defended Drobil, and called Michálek untrustworthy despite his public reputation as a whistleblower. Since the Civic Democrats vowed to fight corruption, losing its first minister to corruption charges was a blow to the party's standing. The Drobil incident was the first of several high-profile resignations. On 21 December 2010, Czech Police Chief Oldrich Martinu resigned after Interior Minister Radek John's month-long call for his ouster in part due to the Drobil case's mishandling. Michálek returned to the State Environmental Fund as a financial analyst in 2011. The Drobil case is on indefinite hiatus for a lack of evidence as of September 2012. As of February 2013, the case against Knetig is on a similar hiatus for insufficient evidence.

Michálek is married and has three children. He is a devout evangelical Christian.

The Senate 

At the end of July 2012, Libor Michálek accepted the Czech Pirate, Green, and Christian Democrat Party senatorial nominations for District 26. The Pirate Party was his primary affiliation due to its transparency and accountability platforms. His personal 12-point platform prioritized direct democracy, fair political party competition, and anti-corruption oversight efforts alongside social welfare reforms. In the October 2012 elections, he won 24.3 percent of the first round vote and 74.4 percent of the first-past-the-post runoff, giving him the seat. Another candidate, Karel Berka, challenged the decision, but the Czech Supreme Administrative Court found the claims unfounded. He was the first Pirate Party candidate to be elected to national office, the 81-seat Czech Senate. His senatorial term was 2012–2018.

Czech President Miloš Zeman has publicly considered Michálek for leading the Supreme Audit Office. In 2013, Michálek authored the first bill designed to protect whistleblowers, which was overwhelmingly rejected on the floor of the Senate.

Awards 

In March 2011, Michálek was awarded first prize from the Endowment Fund Against Corruption for his whistleblowing role in the Environment Ministry corruption scandal. In May 2011, he was awarded the František Kriegel Prize by the Charter 77 Foundation for his "brave, consistent and uncompromising fight against corruption in government."

References

External links 
 
 
 

Living people
1968 births
20th-century Czech economists
Czech Christians
Czech Pirate Party Senators
Members of the Senate of the Czech Republic
Czech whistleblowers
People from Náchod
Masaryk University alumni
Palacký University Olomouc alumni
Alumni of Nottingham Trent University
21st-century Czech economists